The Dent de Crolles is a karstic mountain (2,062 m) of the Chartreuse Mountains range,  north east of Grenoble, Isère, France. It has a characteristic "tooth-like" profile and is easily recognizable in the Isère Valley (Grésivaudan) in the Grenoble area. The French word "dent" means tooth and "de Crolles" is derived from the town of Crolles, located next to the mountain.

Geography
The French word "dent" means tooth and "de Crolles" is derived from the town of Crolles, located next to the mountain. It is easily recognizable from the Val-d´Isère (Grésivaudan) in the Grenoble area.

Cave system
The réseau de la Dent de Crolles, which lies beneath the summit plateau, is one of the most complex and longest cave systems in Europe, and is considered to be one of the birth places of modern caving. Its first detailed exploration was during World War II by a small team of French cavers which included Pierre Chevalier, Fernand Petzl, and Charles Petit-Didier. The lack of available equipment during the war forced the team to develop their own equipment, leading to technical innovation. The first use of the single rope technique with prusik and mechanical rope-ascenders (Henri Brenot's "monkeys", first used by Chevalier and Brenot in a cave in 1934) can be directly associated with its exploration.

Since 1946, the cave has undergone intense and continuous exploration. As of 2022, sixteen separate entrances have been discovered. The cave system is popular for the various through trips that the various entrances allow.

Gallery

Bibliography (in French) 
 La Dent de Crolles et son réseau souterrain, Comité départemental de spéléologie de l'Isère, 1997,  :

References (in French) 
 Site géologique
 Groupe Montagnard des Petites Roches : informations sur le site d'escalade du Luisset.
 escalade/ski/randonnée à la Dent de Crolles sur c2c
 Nouvelles topos de la dent de Crolles, Spéléo Secours Isère, 4 janvier 2015.

References

Mountains of Isère
Mountains of the Alps
Two-thousanders of France
Caves of Auvergne-Rhône-Alpes